Angamaly Diaries is a 2017 Indian Malayalam-language action crime drama film directed by Lijo Jose Pellissery and written by Chemban Vinod Jose. The film features 86 debutant actors, with Antony Varghese, Anna Rajan,  Kichu Tellus, Ullas Jose Chemban, Vineeth Vishwam, Bitto Davis, Tito Wilson, Sarath Kumar, and Sinoj Varghese playing the main roles. The film is Vijay Babu's first sole production under Friday Film House. The film released on 3 March 2017 to critical acclaim and emerged as a major commercial success.

The story follows Vincent Pepe (Antony Varghese) who wants to be a powerful leader of a righteous gang that will rule the town of Angamaly, like his seniors. The film features an uncut 11-minute long take in the climax featuring around 1000 artists. It was included in The Hindu's top 25 Malayalam films of the decade.

The film was remade in Telugu as Falaknuma Das (2019).

Our hero, Pepe, grew up in Angamalay which is a medium sized suburb of Kochi near the airport.  In middle school he and his friends put together an unofficial “team”, a kind of pretend gang.  They hero-worshipped the leading “team” of their area at that time, which was lead by Babuji and his lieutenant Thomas, and used to work out with them and listen to their advice on fighting and strategy.  As young men, they got into their first fight, with outsiders who were bothering the neighborhood girls.  At the same time, our hero started his first sweet romance with a local girl he had known since school days, Seema.  This innocent period ends when Babuji is killed by two local boys Ravi and Rajan who are then sent to jail. A few years later, Pepe still has the same friends and Thomas, Babuji’s friend, has became a member of their “team” in a kind of adviser capacity.  Pepe is seriously dating a nursing student from Germany and looking for a way to build a business that can support himself and his friends.  They start a pork business, at first just buying pigs from Ravi and Rajan who have become the leading merchants in the neighborhood after their return from jail.  Later they start their own pig farm and set up a rival wholesale business to Ravi and Rajan.  During a discussion between the two groups, Pepe and his friends and Ravi and Raman’s young followers lead by Ravi’s brother-in-law get into a fight.  And Pepe accidentally kills one of them.  INTERVAL To resolve the court case, Pepe’s team has to turn to increasingly illegal activities to raise money to pay off Ravi and Raman and their friends.  They open an illegal poker hall and manage to raise the funds.  However, with the case hanging over him, Pepe feels obligated to end his relationship with the nursing student.  At this point, one of his old friend’s older sisters “Lichi” who has returned to the area starts spending more time with him.  And finally proposes, saying that she doesn’t care about the court cases hanging over him, and she will marry him and take him to Dubai with her.  They are married, but even with the court cases settled, Pepe is still in danger because the man he accidentally killed has cousins who have come to Angamaly for revenge.  Ravi and Rajan act as go-betweens and try to keep the situation calm, but it is still a problem and Pepe needs to get out of town.  In the end, while he is waiting for his Dubai Visa to come through and celebrating a festival (not sure which festival, possibly the Cochin Carnival, possibly Vishu), they give the final pay off to Ravi and Rajan who pass on a portion to the cousins of the victim.  However, the cousins are still angry and plan to attack Pepe now, after they have gotten all the money they can.  During the evening festival celebrations, the groups weave in and out of the procession, and finally the fight starts, but not with Pepe as the victim, but Ravi and Rajan, since the cousins have just learned they only got a small proportion of the money Pepe used to pay them off.  The fight ends after the leader of the cousins, who is also Ravi’s brother-in-law, is chased into the fireworks display and everyone watches in stunned silence as his body is blotted out by thousands of fireworks going off on the ground around it.  In an epilogue, we see Pepe alone in a huge construction crane in Dubai.  It is two years later, he still calls home regularly, and life in Angamaly continues without him.

Cast

Production

The film introduces 86 new actors and the audition was held at different parts of Kerala, especially at Kochi. Actor Chemban Vinod Jose wrote the screenplay. The filming started on 11 October 2016 in Kochi. Angamaly Diaries is Vijay Babu's first sole production after the spat with his business partner Sandra Thomas.

Soundtrack

The film's music was composed by Prashant Pillai, with lyrics by P. S. Rafeeque and Preeti Pillai. The full movie soundtrack was released on 23 February 2017 and consists of 9 songs: six original and three alternate versions.

Release
The film was released on 3 March 2017.

Box office
The film received positive reviews from the critics and became commercial success. The film collected over ₹20 crore in its final run in theatres.

Critical Reception

Since its release, Angamaly Diaries has met with critical acclaim. It was lauded for its realistic making, cinematography, casting and performance of actors. The Hollywood Reporter's Deborah Young termed the film as a "rambunctious breakout" and praised the climax describing it as "dazzling, can’t-look-away finale, shot in a single 12-minute take that throws in everything plus the kitchen sink and brings the story to a shrill conclusion".

Anjana George of The Times of India gave the film 4 stars out of 5 and praised the film as "Showcasing a mélange of beautiful visuals, thumping music and natural performances, Angamaly Diaries is one of the more fresh and terrific attempts made by a filmmaker of late in Mollywood Film." She added, "Chemban has weaved in the dialect, food, music and culture of the people in Angamaly to the plot, paying careful attention to every intricate detail, while making it an engaging movie." Anna MM Vetticad of Firstpost also gave it 4 stars out of 5 and called it as a "delightful, unexpectedly hilarious take on the squalid underbelly of Kerala’s Angamaly town.". She added, "If ever there was an example of the committed cinephile’s dictum “it is not the story but the treatment that makes a film”, you have it here. Because if you think about it, Angamaly Diaries – funny and insightful in equal measure – does not have a story in the conventional sense, yet that, among so many other reasons, is what makes it brilliant." Critic Veeyen termed the film as "Excellent" and stated that "the Angamaly that filmmaker  Lijo Jose Pellissery and writer Vinod Jose scribble their diary notes on is a dusty, deafening town that smells of pork and sloshed human blood. The ceaseless squabbles for honour, money and might render it a land with almost dystopian proportions, where a terrifyingly realistic tale of subsistence unfurls." Baradwaj Rangan of Film Companion South wrote "Like last year’s Kannada blockbuster Kirik Party, Angamaly Diaries is proof that these relatively under-the-radar upstart films are making far better use of mainstream tropes – fights, songs, comedy – than your average mega-budget big-star vehicle...like Premam, Angamaly Diaries places a certain kind of small-town, short-fused masculinity under a microscope. Men are defined by their actions – and I’m not just talking about the action sequences."

The film also received high praises from the film fraternity. Actor Mohanlal wrote: "Happened to watch Angamaly Diaries and I'm impressed by the way the movie is made. Brilliant acting by every one and Kudos to the whole team and to Chemban Vinod Jose and Lijo Jose Pellissery". Actor Prithviraj Sukumaran lauded it as a "stunning piece of film making" and praised its "original writing". Actor Nivin Pauly applauded the casting, performances, story calling them "so refreshing and real". Director Karthik Subbaraj called the film as "Super Fantastic" and lauded it, saying "Writing, Performances & Filmmaking Crafts at its best". Director Anurag Kashyap called it as "an extraordinary film" and tagged Angamaly Diaries as his film of the year so far. Antony Varghese won the Youth Icon Award at Asianet Film Awards.

Accolades

Notes

References

External links
 

2017 films
2010s Malayalam-language films
Indian crime drama films
Malayalam films remade in other languages
Films shot in Kochi
Angamaly
Films directed by Lijo Jose Pellissery